Karnataka State Highway 4, commonly referred to as KA SH 4, is a state highway road that runs south through in Bidar district in the state of Karnataka. This state highway touches numerous cities and villages Viz.Halbarga, Bidar.

Route description 
The route followed by this highway is Kamalnagar – Halbarga – Bidar – Gunalli.

Major junctions

State Highways 
 KA SH 15 and KA SH 105 in Bidar district

Connections 
Many villages, cities and towns in various districts are connected by this state highway.

See also
 List of State Highways in Karnataka

References

State Highways in Karnataka
Roads in Bidar district